Gregorio Aldo Arencibia (born 12 March 1947) is a Cuban former cyclist. He competed at the 1972, 1976 and 1980 Summer Olympics as well as the 1971 and 1975 Pan American Games.

At the 1971 Pan American Games in Cali, Colombia, he won a gold medal for the Men's Team Time Trial event alongside Roberto Menéndez, Pedro Rodríguez, and Galio Albolo. At the 1975 Pan American Games in Mexico City, he won the silver medal for the same event alongside Roberto Menéndez, Carlos Cardet, and José Prieto.

References

External links
 

1947 births
Living people
Cuban male cyclists
Olympic cyclists of Cuba
Cyclists at the 1972 Summer Olympics
Cyclists at the 1976 Summer Olympics
Cyclists at the 1980 Summer Olympics
Sportspeople from Havana
Pan American Games medalists in cycling
Pan American Games gold medalists for Cuba
Cyclists at the 1975 Pan American Games
Medalists at the 1975 Pan American Games